Sathi (English: The Companion) is a 1938 Indian Bengali film directed by Phani Majumdar and produced by New Theatres. It was the Bengali version of Street Singer and the film was the debut of Phani Majumdar as a director. The film's cast includes K. L. Saigal, Kanan Devi, Boken Chatto, Amar Mullick, Sailen Chowdhury, and Shyam Laha. The story involves two young street children growing up together, singing on the streets and hoping to make it big in the show world. The film was one of Saigal's "most famous films" and a "classic" as far the music and songs of the films were concerned. The music was composed by R. C. Boral with lyrics by Ajoy Bhattacharya.

Cast
K. L. Saigal
Kanan Devi
Shyam Laha
Boken Chatto
Rekha
Amar Mullick
Sailen Chowdhury
Bhanu Bannerjee
Ahi Sanyal
Khagen Pathak
Sukumar Pal
Binoy Goswami

Music
The music was composed by R. C. Boral with lyrics by Ajoy Bhattacharya.

References

External links

1938 films
Bengali-language Indian films
Films directed by Phani Majumdar
1930s Bengali-language films